17-β-Hydroxysteroid dehydrogenase X (HSD10) also known as 3-hydroxyacyl-CoA dehydrogenase type-2 is a mitochondrial enzyme that in humans is encoded by the HSD17B10 (hydroxysteroid (17β) dehydrogenase 10) gene. Several alternatively spliced transcript variants have been identified, but the full-length nature of only two transcript variants has been determined. Human HSD10 cDNA was cloned from brain (NM_004493), and the resulting protein, a homotetramer, was first characterized as a short chain 3-hydroxyacyl-CoA dehydrogenase (SCHAD). Active sites of this enzyme can accommodate different substrates; 17β-HSD10 is involved in the oxidation of isoleucine, branched-chain fatty acids, and xenobiotics as well as the metabolism of sex hormones and neuroactive steroids.

Function 

17beta-hydroxysteroid dehydrogenase 10 is a member of the short-chain dehydrogenase/reductase superfamily. This homotetrameric mitochondrial multifunctional enzyme catalyzes the oxidation of neuroactive steroids and the degradation of isoleucine. This enzyme is capable of binding to other peptides, such as estrogen receptor α, amyloid-β, and tRNA methyltransferase 10C. Missense mutations of the HSD17B10 gene result in 17β-HSD10 deficiency, an infantile neurodegeneration characterized by progressive psychomotor regression and alteration of mitochondria morphology. 17β-HSD10 exhibits only a negligible alcohol dehydrogenase activity, and is not localized in the endoplasmic reticulum or plasma membrane. Its alternate name – Aβ binding alcohol dehydrogenase (ABAD) – is a misnomer predicated on the mistaken belief that this enzyme is an alcohol dehydrogenase.

Structure

Gene 

Human HSD17B10 gene has 6 exons resides on the X chromosome at p11.22.

Protein 

The gene product is a mitochondrial protein that catalyzes the oxidation of a wide variety of fatty acids and steroids, and is a subunit of mitochondrial ribonuclease P, which is involved in tRNA maturation. The molecular weight of 17β-HSD10 that is composed of four identical subunits is 108 kDa; each subunit consists of 261 amino acid residues. Although the endoplasmic reticulum (ER)-associated amyloid-β peptide binding protein (ERAB) was reported to be associated with the ER and to consist of 262 residues with a molecular weight of 27 kDa, ERAB is actually identical to 17β-HSD10 that is localized in mitochondria but not ER.

Clinical significance 

Abnormal expression, as well as mutations of the HSD17B10 gene leads to impairment of the structure, function, and dynamics of mitochondria. This may underlie the pathogenesis of the synaptic and neuronal deficiency exhibited in 17β-HSD10 related diseases, including 17β-HSD10 deficiency and Alzheimer's disease (AD). Missense and silent mutations in the gene are the cause of hydroxysteroid (17β) dehydrogenase X (HSD10) deficiency, formerly MHBD deficiency, and X-linked mental retardation, choreoathetosis, and abnormal behavior (MRXS10), respectively. Restoration of steroid homeostasis could be achieved by the supplementation of neuroactive steroids with a proper dosing and treatment regimen or by the adjustment of 17β-HSD10 activity to protect neurons. The discovery of this enzyme's true function has opened a new therapeutic avenue for treating AD.

Interactions 

HSD17B10 has been shown to interact with Amyloid precursor protein.

References

Further reading